Davi Machado dos Santos Araújo (born 20 March 1999), known as Davi Araújo, is a Brazilian professional footballer who plays as a forward for Real Brasília.

Professional career
Born in Paracatu, Minas Gerais, Davi Araújo played for América Mineiro as a youth before making his senior debut with Mamoré in 2017, in the Campeonato Mineiro Módulo II.

Davi Araújo moved to Paracatu for the 2018 season; rarely used in his first campaign, he became a regular starter in his second, being named the Best Newcomer of the 2019 Campeonato Brasiliense. Shortly after he signed for Real Brasília, initially impressing with the under-20s and then being promoted to the main squad.

On 17 August 2020, Davi Araújo joined Série A side Botafogo on loan until December 2021. He made his top tier debut twelve days later, coming on as a late substitute for Pedro Raúl in a 2–0 home loss to Internacional.

Career statistics

References

External links
 

1999 births
Living people
Sportspeople from Minas Gerais
Brazilian footballers
Association football forwards
Campeonato Brasileiro Série A players
Esporte Clube Mamoré players
Botafogo de Futebol e Regatas players